Higdon is an unincorporated community in Jackson County, Alabama, United States.

History
A post office called Higdon has been in operation since 1882. The community bears the name of its first postmaster.

Geography
Higdon is located on top of Sand Mountain.

Major highways
 State Route 71

Demographics
As of the census of 2010, there were 1,398 people. The population density was 354.8 persons per square mile.  The racial makeup of the town was 95.5% White, 0.2% Black and 2.1% from two or more races. 0.9% of the population were Hispanic or Latino of any race.

In Higdon, the population was spread out, with 26.1% under the age of 18 and 13.2% who were 64 years of age or older. Marriage status: 15.1% never married, 71.9% now married, 3.8% widowed, and 9.2% divorced.

The per capita income for Higdon was $14,341. About 7.1% of the population were below the poverty line.

Education 
Higdon is home to North Sand Mountain School, which is part of the Jackson County School System.

References

External links 
 http://northsandmountain.jc.schoolinsites.com/

Unincorporated communities in Jackson County, Alabama
Unincorporated communities in Alabama